Nelly and Mr. Arnaud is a 1995 French film directed by Claude Sautet and starring Michel Serrault, Emmanuelle Béart and Jean-Hugues Anglade. It won the César Award for Best Director and Best Actor for Michel Serrault.

Plot
Nelly is married to Jerôme, a man who is unemployed and has stopped searching for work. Nelly was made redundant from her publishing job and now just has odd jobs at a printing shop and a bakery, so trhey have fallen six months behind on the rent for their apartment. Talking with her friend Jacqueline at a coffee shop, she encounters Pierre Arnaud, a wealthy retired businessman who had a languid affair with Jacqueline in the past and who saw Nelly in the past at one of Jacqueline's parties. After discovering Nelly is in debt, Arnaud offers to give Nelly 30,000 francs as a gift. Nelly reluctantly accepts, pays her overdue rent and then leaves her husband.

Nelly agrees to type Arnaud's memoirs, but he insists this will not be to repay the gift; he will pay her. Working at Arnaud's apartment, Nelly learns more of Arnaud's past as a judge in a colony, and later a businessman; he is separated from his wife and largely estranged from his two children.

Nelly has an affair with Vincent, Arnaud's editor. Arnaud feels jealous, although his exact feelings for the much younger Nelly never become entirely clear. Vincent views a new apartment and then asks Nelly to move in. She refuses, telling him she doesn't want to change the character of their relationship, and Vincent immediately breaks up with her.

She continues working for Arnaud until his wife Lucie returns from Geneva for a few days after her partner dies suddenly. Nelly comes to work one morning and finds Arnaud and Lucie with their bags packed, about to leave. Arnaud tells Nelly that he and his wife have decided to take a long round-the-world trip that they always had dreamed of, and see their son in Seattle. The film ends with Arnaud at the airport looking wistful and uncertain, and with Nelly bringing Arnaud's manuscript to Vincent's office, where she is sure to see her former lover.

Cast
 Emmanuelle Béart as Nelly
 Michel Serrault as Pierre Arnaud
 Jean-Hugues Anglade as Vincent Granec
 Claire Nadeau as Jacqueline
 Françoise Brion as Lucie
 Michèle Laroque as Isabelle
 Michael Lonsdale as Dolabella
 Charles Berling as Jerôme

Critical response 
On review aggregator website Rotten Tomatoes the film has an approval rating of 96% based on reviews from 23 critics.

Awards and nominations
BAFTA Awards (UK)
Nominated: Best Film not in the English Language
César Awards (France)
Won: Best Actor – Leading Role (Michel Serrault)
Won: Best Director (Claude Sautet)
Nominated: Best Actor – Supporting Role (Jean-Hugues Anglade)
Nominated: Best Actor – Supporting Role (Michael Lonsdale)
Nominated: Best Actress – Leading Role (Emmanuelle Béart)
Nominated: Best Actress – Supporting Role (Claire Nadeau)
Nominated: Best Editing (Jacqueline Thiédot)
Nominated: Best Film
Nominated: Best Music (Philippe Sarde 
Nominated: Best Sound (Pierre Lenoir and Jean-Paul Loublier)
Nominated: Best Writing (Jacques Fieschi and Claude Sautet)
David di Donatello Awards (Italy)
Won: Best Foreign Film
Valladolid Film Festival
Nominated: Golden Spike (Claude Sautet)
Won: Louis Delluc Prize

References

External links

 

1995 films
1995 drama films
French drama films
1990s French-language films
Films directed by Claude Sautet
Films whose director won the Best Director César Award
Films featuring a Best Actor César Award-winning performance
Films featuring a Best Actor Lumières Award-winning performance
Louis Delluc Prize winners
Films produced by Alain Sarde
Films scored by Philippe Sarde
1990s French films